Dragoslava Mikeš (born 20 August 1973) is a former Bosnian-Serbian basketball player.

References

1973 births
Living people
Sportspeople from Slavonski Brod
Serbs of Croatia
Point guards
Serbian women's basketball players
Bosnia and Herzegovina women's basketball players
Yugoslav women's basketball players
ŽKK Vršac players
Serbian expatriate basketball people in Hungary
Serbian expatriate basketball people in Cyprus
Serbian expatriate basketball people in Israel
Serbian expatriate basketball people in Poland